Ustra is a fortress in the eastern Rhodope Mountains in southern Bulgaria.

The fortress was built in the 10th century AD to protect an important trade route. It was taken by the armies of Simeon the Great (893-927), but after his death, it was among the lands given back to Byzantium in return for recognition of the imperial title of the Bulgarian rulers. Between the 12th and 14th centuries, it frequently changed hands between the two empires, but the Byzantines held it most of the time.

There is a hut of the same name nearby.

Namesake
Ustra Peak on Livingston Island in the South Shetland Islands, Antarctica is named after the fortress.

References 

Castles in Bulgaria
Buildings and structures in Kardzhali Province
Rhodope Mountains